Sidney and Beatrice Webb may refer to:

Sidney Webb, 1st Baron Passfield (1859–1947), English socialist, economist, reformer and a co-founder of the London School of Economics
Beatrice Webb (1858–1943), English sociologist, economist, socialist, labour historian and social reformer